Favio Damián Fernández (born 25 July 1972, in Quilmes) is a retired Argentine football coach and former player.

A midfielder, Fernández played for a number of clubs in Argentina, RCD Espanyol in Spain and Deportivo Táchira in Venezuela.

External links

1972 births
Living people
People from Quilmes
Argentine footballers
Club de Gimnasia y Esgrima La Plata footballers
Club Atlético Independiente footballers
Unión de Santa Fe footballers
Club Atlético Huracán footballers
La Liga players
RCD Espanyol footballers
Argentine Primera División players
Argentine expatriate footballers
Argentine expatriate sportspeople in Spain
Expatriate footballers in Venezuela
Expatriate footballers in Spain
Association football midfielders
Sportspeople from Buenos Aires Province
Argentine football managers
Aldosivi managers